Iringa is a city in Tanzania with a population of 151,345. It is situated at a latitude of 7.77°S and longitude of 35.69°E. The name is derived from the Hehe word lilinga, meaning fort. Iringa is the administrative capital of Iringa Region. Iringa Municipal Council is the administrative designation of the Municipality of Iringa.
Iringa has been one of the coldest regions in Tanzania due to its geographical location but that has attracted a lot of tourists from colder regions abroad especially Western Europe. Iringa also hosts one of Africa’s largest national parks the Ruaha National Park.

Geography
The town stretches along a hilltop overlooking the Little Ruaha River to the south, and spreads along ridges and valleys to the north. The months of June, July, and August can see low temperatures near freezing.

Climate
Iringa has a fairly dry subtropical highland climate (Köppen Cwb) bordering on a tropical savanna climate (Aw) with a wet season from December to April.

History

Iringa Region is home to the Hehe people. After their defeat at Lugalo by the Hehe, led by Chief Mkwawa, the Germans built a military station at 'Neu Iringa' to avenge the death of their commander Emil von Zelewski and to teach the Hehe respect for German authority. The fortress and headquarters of Chief Mkwawa was in the nearby village of Kalenga, Alt Iringa.

Education

Iringa has several institutions of higher education, including Tumaini University, Iringa University College, Mkwawa University College of Education (a constituent college of the University of Dar es Salaam), and Ruaha Catholic University (RUCU)). There are also secondary schools like Tosamaganga high school, Malangali high school, Iringa girls' secondary school, Ifunda technical school and Ruaha Secondary School.

Economy

Iringa has a well-established industrial base, including food processing and logistics industries. Most of its electricity comes from the nearby Mtera Dam. Iringa is a minor transport hub for regular bus travelers. It is a center for trucking services to Dar es Salaam, Mbeya, Songea, and Dodoma and other regions of Tanzania. It is also a servicing town for trucks going to neighboring countries such as Zambia, Democratic Republic of Congo, Malawi, Burundi and other EAC countries.

Crafts
Iringa is known for its woven baskets, made from local reeds. The baskets are used across Tanzania and exported internationally. The city is also known for the award-winning Neema Crafts Centre.

Media

Iringa municipality has seven FM radio stations: Trap Gang Radio, Ebony FM, Country FM and Nuru FM (youth entertainment and commercial radios), Overcomers Radio and Radio Furaha (Christian stations), Kibra Ten Radio (a Muslim station). There are other radio stations elsewhere in Iringa region, such as Kitulo community radio in Makete and another FM radio station in Njombe.

Iringa has one TV station: Municipal Television, a multi-age TV station with diversified programmes.

References

Populated places in Iringa Region
Regional capitals in Tanzania